The 19th Hong Kong Awards ceremony, honored the best films of 1999 and took place on 16 April 2000 at the Hong Kong Coliseum, Hung Hom, Kowloon, Hong Kong. The ceremony was hosted by Eric Tsang, Sandra Ng and Vincent Kok, during the ceremony awards are presented in 16 categories.

Awards
Winners are listed first, highlighted in boldface, and indicated with a double dagger.

References

External links
 Official website of the Hong Kong Film Awards

2000
1999 film awards
2000 in Hong Kong
Hong